Daniel D. Sutton (born August 4, 1970) was a Democratic member of the South Dakota Senate, representing the 8th district from 2001 through 2008. During his time in the state senate, he served as Minority Whip. Sutton was a member of the South Dakota House of Representatives from 1999 through 2000.

Sexual abuse allegations 
In 2007, Sutton was sued for sexually abusing an 18-year-old legislative page. The case was settled with no money being paid to the person.

References

 Ellis, Jonathan (13 March 2020). "'I don't want anyone else to get hurt': Former state senator, mayoral candidate accused of sexual abuse". Argus Leader. Retrieved 6 June 2020.

External links
South Dakota Legislature - Dan Sutton official SD Senate website

Project Vote Smart - Senator Dan Sutton (SD) profile
Follow the Money - Dan Sutton
2006 2004 2002 2000 campaign contributions

South Dakota state senators
Members of the South Dakota House of Representatives
1970 births
Living people
People from Flandreau, South Dakota